Farmersville is a village in Montgomery County, Illinois, United States. The population was 724 at the 2010 census.

Geography

Demographics

As of the census of 2000, there were 768 people, 313 households, and 210 families residing in the village. The racial makeup of the village was 98.18% White, 0.39% Native American, 1.30% Asian, and 0.13% from two or more races. Hispanic or Latino of any race were 0.52% of the population.

There were 313 households, out of which 34.2% had children under the age of 18 living with them, 56.5% were married couples living together, 7.3% had a female householder with no husband present, and 32.6% were non-families. 29.7% of all households were made up of individuals, and 13.1% had someone living alone who was 65 years of age or older. The average household size was 2.45 and the average family size was 3.04.

In the village, the population was spread out, with 27.3% under the age of 18, 8.5% from 18 to 24, 30.6% from 25 to 44, 21.1% from 45 to 64, and 12.5% who were 65 years of age or older. The median age was 35 years. For every 100 females, there were 86.9 males. For every 100 females age 18 and over, there were 81.8 males.

The median income for a household in the village was $35,893, and the median income for a family was $41,417. Males had a median income of $35,263 versus $21,328 for females. The per capita income for the village was $16,606. About 5.5% of families and 8.2% of the population were below the poverty line, including 7.1% of those under age 18 and 12.8% of those age 65 or over.

Transportation 

Farmersville is located off Interstate 55 at Exit 72.

Local events

Irish Days
Farmersville currently has festival days entitled "Irish Days" which takes place the second full weekend of June beginning on Thursday and ending Saturday night.

Education

Farmersville is one of four main communities that make up the Panhandle School District (also known as Panhandle CUSD #2).  The district's junior and senior high schools are located in the same building in Raymond, which is located approximately ten miles southeast of Farmersville in Montgomery County.  Farmersville itself is served by Farmersville Grade School (Pre-K through 1st Grade).

Notable people 

 Donald T. Barry, Illinois state representatives, nurse, and anesthetist; born on a farm near Farmersville
 Daniel Curzon, author, was raised as Daniel Brown in Farmersville
 Milt Welch, catcher for the Detroit Tigers; born in Farmersville

References

External links
Farmersville Illinois, Historical Society of Montgomery County Illinois

Villages in Montgomery County, Illinois
Villages in Illinois